Michael Francis Madelin (1931–2007) was a British mycologist.  He held research faculty positions at Imperial College, University of London, and the University of Bristol, and undertook pioneering research in conidial fungi and slime moulds, with specific reference to their physiology and ecology.

Early life and education 
Madelin was raised in London and was a pupil at the Slough Grammar School and Latymer Upper School. In 1947, he took a gap year after secondary school to work at the Commonwealth Mycological Institute in Kew. His undergraduate studies was at Imperial College London, graduating with first class honours in botany at the age of 20 and won the Forbes Memorial Medal and Prize in Biology. M. F. Madelin continued his graduate studies at the same institution under the supervision of the pioneer British plant pathologist, R. K. S. Wood, and earned his PhD in mycology in 1954. Between 1955 and 1957, Michael Madelin did his national service as a flight lieutenant in the Royal Air Force.

Career 
He became a lecturer at the University College of the Gold Coast, then part of the University of London external system, where he researched tropical fungal parasites in insects and developed a lifelong interest in the subject. Moving back to Imperial College, he taught courses in plant pathology before accepting a mycology research-lectureship at the University of Bristol in 1962. For his groundbreaking research conducted at Imperial College, he received the Huxley Memorial Medal and Prize in 1967. He taught a popular course, Medicine and Mycology, to medical students at Cambridge. He also carried out various academic assignments at the universities of Bath, Hull and Exeter.

Madelin was a visiting researcher at several institutions abroad in Chennai, India; Suva, Fiji and Madrid, Spain. He was the co-convener of the First International Fungus Spore Symposium which took place in Bristol in 1965. He was influential in other international meetings in mycology, particularly those held in Kananaskis, Alberta; Gwatt, Switzerland; Exeter, UK and Berkeley, California. He served in various capacities at the British Mycological Society as the Programme Secretary, Vice-President, and President. M. F. Madelin co-edited the Journal of General Microbiology, now named Microbiology, for six years in the early 1970s.

He was the doctoral advisor of the pioneering Ghanaian plant pathologist, George C. Clerk (1931–2019). He also collaborated with the Indian botanist, C. V. Subramanian.

He retired from Bristol in 1991 and relocated to Oxford. He then devoted himself to popular science, teaching fungi at the university and through broadcast journalism on television and radio.

Personal life 
He was married to Therese and they had five children.

Final years and death 
Later in life, M. F. Madelin was diagnosed with Lewy body dementia and Parkinson's disease.  He died in Oxford in 2007, aged 76. His remains were buried at the Wolvercote Cemetery.

Bibliography

Further reading

Works 
The following are scientific publications of Michael Francis Madelin:

Footnotes

References

1931 births
2007 deaths
British mycologists
Academics of Imperial College London
Academics of the University of Bristol
Alumni of Imperial College London
Alumni of the University of London
20th-century British botanists
Burials at Wolvercote Cemetery
Royal Air Force officers
Military personnel from London
People with Lewy body dementia
People with Parkinson's disease